This is a list of defunct airlines of the United Kingdom.

See also

 List of airlines of the United Kingdom
 List of airports in the United Kingdom and the British Crown Dependencies

References

 
 

United Kingdom
 Defunct